The Department for Levelling Up, Housing and Communities (DLUHC), formerly the Ministry for Housing, Communities and Local Government (MHCLG), is a department of His Majesty's Government responsible for housing, communities, local government in England and the levelling up policy. It was established in May 2006 and is the successor to the Office of the Deputy Prime Minister, established in 2001. The department shares its headquarters building, at 2 Marsham Street in London, with the Home Office. It was renamed to add Housing to its title and changed to a ministry in January 2018, and later reverted to a government department in the 2021 reshuffle.

There are corresponding departments in the Scottish Government, the Welsh Government and the Northern Ireland Executive, responsible for communities and local government in their respective jurisdictions.

Ministers 
The DLUHC's ministers are as follows:

The Permanent Secretary is Sarah Healey who took up his post on 7th February 2023.

History 
DLUHC was formed in July 2001 as part of the Cabinet Office with the title Office of the Deputy Prime Minister (ODPM), headed by the then Deputy Prime Minister, John Prescott. In May 2002 the ODPM became a separate department after absorbing the local government and regions portfolios from the defunct Department for Transport, Local Government and the Regions. The ODPM was criticised in some quarters for adding little value and the Environmental Audit Committee had reported negatively on the department in the past. 
During the 5 May 2006 reshuffle of Tony Blair's government, it was renamed and Ruth Kelly succeeded David Miliband to become the first Secretary of State for Communities and Local Government at the Department for Communities and Local Government (DCLG). In January 2018, as part of Theresa May's Cabinet reshuffle, the department was renamed the Ministry of Housing, Communities and Local Government (MHCLG). In September 2021, Boris Johnson renamed the department yet again, calling it the Department for Levelling Up, Housing and Communities (DLUHC), being more powers outside of just England to manage funds across the United Kingdom.

On 20 February 2021, it was announced as part of the government's levelling up policy, that DLUHC would be the first government department to have a headquarters based outside of London. Five hundred posts, including those of senior civil servants, will be moving to Wolverhampton by 2025.

On 23 February 2021, the then Secretary of State, Robert Jenrick, announced he was hopeful that staff would be working in Wolverhampton by the summer of 2021. He also announced that they were considering building a new office development in or around the city centre to house the new headquarters. The Prime Minister, Boris Johnson, suggested it should be within walking distance of local newspaper Express & Star, where he previously did work experience.

As DLUHC looks set to relocate some 500 members of staff to Wolverhampton, Robert Jenrick officially opened its new Wolverhampton offices at the recently completed i9 office development on 10 September 2021. At the opening of the new office development the Secretary of State was joined by the leader of City of Wolverhampton Council Ian Brookfield and the West Midlands Mayor, Andy Street.

On 6 July 2022, most of the ministers responsible for the department resigned after the Chris Pincher Scandal. The secretary of state, Michael Gove, also left the department on the same day, after being sacked for disloyalty by the prime minister, Boris Johnson. 

Michael Gove was reappointed as the secretary of state by the prime minister Rishi Sunak on 25 October 2022.

Secretaries of State

 David Miliband 11 May 2005 – 5 May 2006
 Ruth Kelly 5 May 2006 – 27 June 2007
 Hazel Blears 27 June 2007 – 5 June 2009
 John Denham 5 June 2009 – 11 May 2010
 Eric Pickles 12 May 2010 – 11 May 2015
 Greg Clark 11 May 2015 – 14 July 2016
 Sajid Javid 13 July 2016 – 30 April 2018
 James Brokenshire 30 April 2018 – 24 July 2019
 Robert Jenrick 24 July 2019 – 15 September 2021
 Michael Gove 15 September 2021 – 6 July 2022
 Greg Clark 7 July 2022 – 6 September 2022
 Simon Clarke 6 September 2022 – 25 October 2022
 Michael Gove 25 October 2022 – current

Responsibilities
The department is responsible for UK Government policy in the following areas, mainly in England:

 Building regulations
 Community cohesion
 Community resilience (i.e. flood, natural disaster or severe weather preparedness and recovery) 
 Housing
 Local government
 Planning
 Race equality
 Urban regeneration (including The Thames Gateway)

Levelling Up

The Levelling Up Taskforce was formed in September 2021 headed by former Bank of England Chief Economist Andy Haldane. The Levelling Up policy was not initially defined in detail, but would include:
Investing in towns, cities, and rural and coastal areas
Giving those areas more control of how investment is made
Levelling up skills using apprenticeships and a £3 billion National Skills Fund
Helping the farming and fishing industries
Creating up to 10 freeports to help deprived communities

Bodies sponsored by DLUHC

Executive agencies
 Planning Inspectorate
 Queen Elizabeth II Centre

The department also was previously responsible for two other agencies. On 18 July 2011 Ordnance Survey was transferred to the Department for Business, Innovation and Skills and on 28 February 2013 the Fire Service College was sold to Capita.

Non-departmental public bodies 
In January 2007, Ruth Kelly announced proposals to bring together the delivery functions of the Housing Corporation, English Partnerships and parts of the then Department for Housing, Communities and Local Government to form a new unified housing and regeneration agency, the Homes and Communities Agency (renamed Homes England in 2018). Initially announced as Communities England, it became operational in December 2008. This also includes the Academy for Sustainable Communities. The year 2008 was also when the department along with the Local Government Association produced the National Improvement and Efficiency Strategy which led to the creation of nine Regional Improvement and Efficiency Partnerships (RIEPs) with devolved funding of £185m to drive sector-led improvement for councils.

Devolution 
Its main counterparts in the devolved nations of the UK are as follows.

Scotland
 Communities Directorates
 Learning and Justice Directorates

Northern Ireland
 Executive Office (civil resilience, community cohesion, race relations)
 Department of Agriculture, Environment and Rural Affairs (local government, planning)
 Department of Finance (building regulations)
 Department of Health (fire services)
 Department for Communities (housing, urban regeneration)

Wales
 Welsh Government Department for Local Government and Public Services

See also 
 Budget of the United Kingdom
 Council house
 Energy efficiency in British housing
 Flag protocol
 Homes and Communities Agency
 Local Resilience Forum
 English Partnerships
 Housing Corporation
 Housing estate
Regions of England
 Social Exclusion Task Force
 Local Government Association
 Regional Improvement and Efficiency Partnership

References

External links 
Official website
Local Government Channel
Communities UK YouTube channel

 
Ministerial departments of the Government of the United Kingdom
 
2006 establishments in the United Kingdom
2006 establishments in England
United Kingdom
United Kingdom
Ministries established in 2006
Governance of England
Local government ministries